This is a list of rack-mount or tabletop communications receivers that include short wave frequencies. This list does not include handheld, portable or consumer grade equipment. Those that include VHF or UHF can be termed wideband receivers, whereas those without HF would be termed scanners, or surveillance receivers. Receivers without controls, that are operated or implemented in computers are in the list of software-defined radios.

See also
 List of amateur radio transceivers

References

Electronics lists
Receiver (radio)
Types of radios